The forest robin or orange-breasted forest robin (Stiphrornis erythrothorax) is a species of bird from Central and West Africa. It is monotypic in the genus Stiphrornis. It has been placed in the family Turdidae, but is now generally placed in Muscicapidae in the group popularly known as chats. Most taxonomists consider it a single species, but some reviews have recommended recognizing 5 species.

Description

Taxonomy
The initial split into multiple species within this genus is based on a review from 1999 where it, based on the phylogenetic species concept, was argued that all then recognized taxa should be considered monotypic species. Of these, S. gabonensis and S. xanthogaster were formerly considered subspecies of S. erythrothorax, whereas S. sanghensis was described as an entirely new species. The split was not followed in Handbook of the Birds of the World, where it was described as "perhaps premature". Comparably, the BirdLife Taxonomic Working Group (and consequently IUCN) recommended not following the split, as differences in plumages are relatively small, genetic sampling considered incomplete, and evidence for intergradation or parapatry is lacking. Another species from this complex, S. pyrrholaemus, was described as a new species in 2008. Based on mtDNA, it is placed within S. erythrothorax sensu lato, and consequently is only a species (rather than a subspecies of S. erythrothorax) if at least some of the taxonomy recommended in 1999 is followed. The genetic divergence between S. pyrrholaemus and other members of the genus is comparable to that between some other closely related species.

Three additional taxa in the forest robin complex were described (as species) in 2016: Stiphrornis (erythrothorax) dahomeyensis (Dahomey forest robin), S. (e.) inexpectatus (Ghana forest robin), and S. (e.) rudderi (Rudder's forest robin). These three taxa are nested within S. erythrothorax sensu lato; however, using the phylogenetic species concept, the study recommended the treatment of all eight forest robin taxa as distinct species.

Clements recognizes three species. the olive-backed forest robin, Stiphrornis pyrrholaemus, the orange-breasted forest robin, Stiphrornis erythrothorax, and the yellow-breasted forest robin, Stiphrornis mabirae.

Subspecies
The currently-recognized taxa in the forest robin complex are:

 Olive-backed forest robin Stiphrornis erythrothorax pyrrholaemus Schmidt & Angehr, 2008
 Western forest robin Stiphrornis erythrothorax erythrothorax Hartlaub, 1855
 Gabon forest robin Stiphrornis erythrothorax gabonensis Sharpe, 1883
 Dahomey forest robin Stiphrornis erythrothorax dahomeyensis Voelker et al., 2016
 Ghana forest robin Stiphrornis erythrothorax inexpectatus Voelker et al., 2016
 Eastern forest robin Stiphrornis erythrothorax xanthogaster Sharpe, 1903
 Sangha forest robin Stiphrornis erythrothorax sanghensis Beresford & Cracraft, 1999
 Rudder's forest robin Stiphrornis erythrothorax rudderi Voelker et al., 2016

The relationships among the taxa are as follows:

References

forest robin
forest robin
Birds of Sub-Saharan Africa
forest robin